Najafgarh drain bird sanctuary (proposed) and wetland ecosystem is composed of the wetland ecosystem and wildlife habitat on several kilometres of the Najafgarh drain or nullah which passes through rural southwest Delhi in India's capital territory. It includes the portion draining the depression or basin area that formed the once famous but now completely drained Najafgarh lake or Najafgarh jheel.

Within the National Capital Territory of Delhi (NCT) this water-way, which is misclassified and misnamed as a mere drain (Najafgarh drain or nullah) is, in fact, the continuation of Sahibi River and an elongation of the Najafgarh jheel Lake. It is a tributary to River Yamuna in which it outfalls here. It becomes a refuge to thousands of migratory waterbirds every winter. The winter months are the best time to visit it to see many flocks of wintering waterbirds. It is currently classified as a Protected Forest and Recorded Forest (Notified Forest Areas in Delhi) as "M. P. Green area Najafgarh Drain (Tagore garden)", "Afforestation M.P.Green Area Najafgarh Drain (DDA)" and "Chhawla or Najafgarh drain city forest (29.64 Acre)".

The wetland ecosystem and wildlife habitat on several kilometres of less polluted Najafgarh drain in rural Delhi before entering the main city, including the former Najafgarh lake or Najafgarh jheel area, is very important habitat to migratory waterbirds as well as local wildlife. It has been earmarked to be declared a bird sanctuary for Delhi. The area came to be recognised as an important wildlife habitat after a local naturalist studying the area during 1986 to 1989 called attention to it, recommending it to be conserved as a bird sanctuary. After this, the Delhi wildlife department posted 16 guards in the area to control illegal bird hunters, including diplomats from various international embassies located in Delhi, India's capital. Delhi Administration officials were tasked with declaring about 25 km stretch of the drain in rural Delhi, including where it passes through the core area of the now drained Najafgarh Lake or jheel, protected under the Wildlife Act after Lt. Governor of Delhi Mr. H.L. Kapur was invited to the area for touring the site where he also heard accounts of local villagers about the rampant illegal hunting of waterbirds that went on here every year. The existing staff of the Flood Control and Irrigation Department, numbering about 40, were also given the additional responsibility of protecting the wildlife on and around the drain.

The Najafgarh drain has been much widened over the years to drain all the water which in earlier decades used to collect in the Nagafgarh lake or Jheel basin. This was supposedly done to remove the threat of flooding in Delhi, and now the drain itself acts as an elongated water body or lake. It has trees planted on both its embankments and an inspection road running on one embankment. During the winter months it attracts vast quantities of migratory birds, and supports local wildlife year-round. Due to the rich wildlife observed in and around the less polluted stretch of the drain outside of congested populated areas, it has been proposed as a bird sanctuary for Delhi.

The Delhi Tourism and Transport Development Corporation has proposed the development of a bird sanctuary on the Najafgarh Drain. The sanctuary would cover an area of several kilometres along the Najafgarh drain and has advised to plant a large number of trees on both its embankments to form a thick forest belt. The Indian National Trust for Art and Cultural Heritage (INTACH) had been appointed as a consultant for the project. INTACH has been doing macro water harvesting since 1995 and has helped in creating a bird sanctuary on an 11-km stretch of water body that formed the Najafgarh Nallah (Drain).

The 51 km-long Najafgarh drain starts at Dhansa and joins the Yamuna river near Wazirabad. 30 kilometres of the drain is in rural Delhi. With the help of the Irrigation and Flood Control Department of the Delhi Government, the drain was de-silted to increase its storage capacity. Regulators at Kakraula and Dhansa retain the water. Presently the brackish water is improving with dilution. By retaining the water in the drain, the aquifers and groundwater table have been recharged and there is more water now for irrigation, enabling farmers 6 kilometres away from the drain to grow crops. Tube wells in the area have been discharging water copiously and in two years the water table is up by a meter.

A July 2003 report by the Central Pollution Control Board, Ministry of Environment and Forests of India pointed out:

Poachers, bird-watchers and bird-counts
Due to a large influx of various species of migratory waterfowl and waterbirds every winter, the drain has been a popular location for decades for illegal poachers, including diplomats from various embassies of different countries in Delhi who come to shoot birds annually with shotguns in their foreign cars with blue diplomatic number plates.

Bird watchers also visit the area now and conduct annual bird-counts.

Misclassified, misnamed as a drain: it's a mix of a river and a lake

Within National Capital Territory of Delhi (NCT) this water-way misclassified, misnamed as a mere drain (Najafgarh drain or nullah) is, in fact, the continuation of Sahibi River and an elongation of the Najafgarh jheel Lake. Historically during the 1960s and before, the rain-fed Sahibi River which originates in Jaipur District. of Rajasthan passing through Alwar District. in Rajasthan and Gurgaon District. in Haryana entered U.T. of Delhi near Dhansa and spilled its overflow in the Najafgarh Jheel (lake) basin creating a seasonal lake, a vast area more than 300sq km was submerged in some seasons, this water then continued to flow on the other side forming a tributary and outfalled into River Yamuna. In the following decades this Sahibi River flow reaching Dhansa regulators was channelised by digging out a wide drain and connecting it directly to the River Yamuna, this in effect also completely drained off the seasonal Najafgarh Jheel which used to form here in the past. The drain channel from Dhansa regulators to Keshopur Bus Depot on Outer Ring Road is wide with thick and high embankments, vast amount of water is retained in this widened drain by closing the Kakrola regulators under Najafgarh Road to recharge the local ground watertable hence it acts like an elongated lake as well.

Najafgarh drain or nullah

The Najafgarh drain or Najafgarh nullah (nullah in Hindi means drain) is just another name for the River Sahibi which continues its flow through Delhi where it is channelled due to control floods, it is a tributary to River Yamuna in which it outfalls here. Within Delhi it is erroneously called "Najafgarh drain" or "Najafgarh nullah"', it gets this name from the once famous and huge Najafgarh lake near the town of Najafgarh in southwest Delhi and within urbanised Delhi it is the Indian capital's most polluted water body due to direct inflow of untreated sewage from surrounding populated areas. A January 2005 report by the Central Pollution Control Board clubs this drain with 13 other highly polluted wetlands under category "D" for assessing the water quality of wetlands in wildlife habitats.

Najafgarh lake, marsh or jheel

Najafgarh lake, Najafgarh marsh or Najafgarh jheel (Jheel in Hindi means a lake) used to be a vast lake in the south west of Delhi in India near the town of Najafgarh from which it takes its name, it was connected to the river Yamuna by a natural shallow nullah or drain called the Najafgarh nullah. However, after the 1960s the Flood Control Department of Delhi kept widening the Najafgarh drain in the pretext of saving Delhi from floods and eventually quickly drained the once huge and ecologically rich Najafgarh lake completely. Rainwater accumulating in the Najafgarh lake or jheel basin had been recorded to have occupied more than 300 square kilometres in many years before its unfortunate draining.

However, with recent advances in ecological understanding it has become clear that draining of this vast lake affected the entire climate of this important region that is India's capital territory and its neighbourhood. The draining of the lake completely also caused the watertable in the entire area to go down and the area becoming arid. There have been some plans since to at least resurrect a much smaller lake in the area. Most of the Najafgarh jheel basin lands have increased many folds in their value owing to them coming within Delhi, India's capital territory and are under ownership of farmers who may want to make a fast buck selling them to developers who want to convert the former lake basin into housing complexes as has already been happening with major housing colonies coming up in the region. If Najafgarh drain, which was built to drain the original Najafgarh lake or jheel, ever breaches its wide embankments it will flood these developed lands owing to them spread all over the former low lying jheel or lake basin.

Pre-draining history: A Vast lake

Before the unfortunate complete draining of this lake in the 1960s by widening of the Najafgarh drain by the Flood control and irrigation department of Delhi the lake in many years filled up a depression more than 300 square kilometres in rural delhi, It had an extremely rich wetland ecosystem forming a refuge for vast quantities of waterbirds and local wildlife. The lake was one of the last habitats of the famed and endangered Siberian Crane which has all but vanished from the Indian subcontinent now. Till before independence many British colonial Officers and dignitaries came in large parties for waterfowl hunting every season.

Recharging of ground water table and irrigation
The continuous widening of the Najafgarh drain since the 1960s led to the complete draining of the once vast and rich Najafgarh lake, jheel or marsh which directly affected the ground water table in the entire surrounding region as all the rain water after yearly monsoons that used to collect in the vast lake basin in previous years now ran off swiftly through the widened drain into river Yamuna in which it outfalls, this has been affecting the entire climate of the region as well making the region more arid and creating water shortages for the purpose of irrigation or human consumption for the people of Delhi and surrounding regions.

Currently the drain is so wide and deep that it acts as an elongated lake in its own right and can hold and store a lot of rain water which can be regulated through regulators built into it at intervals. Maintaining of proper water-level in the drain and storage of rainwater in it during the summer months leads to recharging of ground water table which the surrounding farmers find much helpful as they access the high water table though tube wells dug on their farmlands though which they pump out water to irrigate their crops, farmers owning farmlands bordering the drain in rural Delhi directly use pipes and hoses to pump out water from the drain for irrigation purposes.

Forested embankments
The Najafgarh drain has been much widened over the past decades and now has thick mud embankments on both its sides to channel the waters and protect Delhi from floods, these embankments have been planted with thick forest cover which serve as a much needed habitat for remnant local wildlife occurring in nearby and surrounding farmlands including common foxes, jackals, hares, wild cats, nilgai, porcupines and various reptiles and snakes including the dreaded cobras. Many local birds including waterbirds roost and nest in these trees.

Sections of the forested embankments of Najafgarh drain are currently classified as and are featured in Protected Forests and Recorded Forests (Notified Forest Areas in Delhi) as "M. P. Green area Najafgarh Drain (Tagore garden)", "Afforestation M.P.Green Area Najafgarh Drain (DDA)" and "Chhawla or Najafgarh drain city forest (29.64 Acre)".

Accessibility: drivable road on embankment
There is a well-kept drivable inspection road maintained by Irrigation and Flood Control Department of Delhi on one of the drains embankment throughout its entire length of several kilometres running through rural Delhi from Dhansa regulators at the southwest border of Delhi with the state of Haryana to where the drain crosses under the outer ring road at Keshopur bus depot near the Najafgarh road between the housing colonies of Vikaspuri and Tilak Nagar in New Delhi.

Wildlife and waterbirds can be easily viewed from vehicles by driving on this road and stopping intermittently and going down to the waters edge. As the width of the drain is limited the flocks of waterfowl and other waterbirds in the drain can be easily observed from the drain's edges and this same fact makes the birds much more vulnerable to hunting as they remain in easy reach of the poacher's shotguns and the nets and traps set for them by local villagers and professional trappers.

Clogging of water surface with floating overgrowth of water hyacinth
The water hyacinth, an introduced invasive species of fast growing floating plants completely clogs the open water surface of the drain in many areas annually and lot of funds and labour is employed by the flood control department to clear it some what to keep the water flow uninterrupted. The removing of the water hyacinth by labourers also open ups the water surface for birds and migratory waterfowl which take refuge here every winter.

Fishing
The relatively cleaner portion of the drain in rural southwest Delhi before it enters densely populated and badly polluted area at Vikaspuri also attracts some small scale local village fishermen, occasionally one can be seen casting his line or net in the waters or floating on a black inflated truck tire tube spreading his fishing net across the breadth of the drain. A fishing license is needed to catch fish legally in Delhi waters.

Farmlands in the Najafgarh lake basin area an important habitat
Farmland with very little disturbance acts as an important bird habitat in the Najafgarh lake basin, even fields lying fallow are used by hundreds of congregating demoiselle cranes and common cranes, pairs of Sarus cranes can be seen in the adjoining farmland along the Najafgarh drain. Other resident wild bird and animals also inhabit these farmlands including hares, nilgai, wildcat, common fox, jackal, monitor lizards, various varieties of snakes etc. which also come for shelter into the forested embankments of the drain and disperse into the neighbouring farmland for foraging.

Development of major housing colonies in the former Najafgarh lake basin
After the complete draining of the lake in the 1960s the former lake basin was converted into farmland first and by now various large scale housing projects occupy the former lake basin including Vikaspuri, Uttam Nagar, Pappankalan, and Dwarka. The Delhi airport also borders the former lake basin.

Land costs have skyrocketed and builders and developers have converged on this area which falls within Delhi. Land use is changing from farming to housing colony urban development. However, if the Najafgarh Drain ever breaches its man-made and fortified embankments during the monsoon season, large swaths of these housing colonies could be flooded.

Bird strikes: Delhi Airport's civil aviation concerns
Many flocks of migratory waterbirds during winter months have been using the Najafgarh drain and before that the once famous but now completely drained Najafgarh lake and also the other village and temporary ponds in the area after the rainy season as a winter refuge since times immemorial. In recent decades Delhi Airport (Indira Gandhi International Airport including the Delhi domestic airport) was built and expanded on the border of these lands and wildlife habitat. There have been concerns that one of the reasons for increasing Bird strikes on the landing and taking off commercial jets at the Delhi domestic as well as the international Airport could be the birds being attracted by Najafgarh Drain, sources interviewed by Times News Network in 2009 said: "The airport is facing so many problems only because they have taken up a huge area for development and displaced the animals and birds from there. The nearby Najafgarh drain could also be a factor why birds come into this area". Due to this reason there may also be some resistance to grant it the final approval with a Bird Sanctuary status.

In similar cases it has been suggested that carcasses and feathers of birds striking aircraft should be routinely collected and listed and made available to wildlife officials to ascertain which species are mainly responsible for bird strikes and if they are waterbirds at all to help find solution to this problem. Trained meat-eating hunting raptor birds of prey such as falcons, hawks and eagles are routinely kept on airport premises and flown throughout the day by keepers to scare bird flocks away from airports, bird activity in the nights could be controlled through other well researched methods employed by other airports.

However the waterbirds wintering on the Najafgarh drain may not be the ones responsible for air strikes at all as in 2008, the airfield environment management committee found that several illegal slaughterhouses near the airport area were attracting birds that were leading to problems for the aircraft. It was decided that these slaughterhouses should be shut down with immediate effect and the civic agencies responsible would take appropriate action. Officials highlighted six critical areas of Dwarka, Indira Market in RK Puram, Sadar Bazar, Mehram Nagar, Dabri More and Gazipur, where the illegal slaughterhouses were operating. Delhi International Airport (P) Ltd (DIAL) also adopted several other measures to deal with this problem. It used noise emitting guns to scare away birds and employed around 120 bird chasers, it also pigeon proofed all buildings and hangars to prevent the birds from nesting on the premises. Regular garbage removal and rodent control measures were put into place to discourage the birds.

"At IGIA (Indira Gandhi International Airport), several steps have been taken to control the bird menace, which include positioning of 25 zone guns along the runway, deployment of 50 bird chasers, installation of reflective tapes, bursting of crackers, scare crow devices on jeeps, regular grass cutting and pesticide spraying," the Indira Gandhi International Airport management stated. An Airfield Environment Management Committee (AEMC) headed by the environment secretary, government of NCTDelhi, also takes up initiatives such as waste management, garbage removal, curbing slaughter houses and meat shops. "As per international standards, the 'desired bird strike rate' is 1 per 10,000 aircraft movements and at Delhi it is much below that rate," the IGIA statement informs.

Birds most commonly involved in Bird strikes are Pariah or Black Kite which is a medium-sized bird, Red-wattled Lapwing, a small bird usually seen in pairs or small flocks, Cattle Egret, known as a cosmopolitan type of a heron. Apart from these, pigeons and crows also affect flights, these birds are not related to the wetland ecosystem of Najafgarh drain but are local to the immediate vicinity and premises of the Delhi Airport.

See also
 Najafgarh drain, Delhi
 Nearby Najafgarh lake or Najafgarh jheel (now completely drained by Najafgarh drain)
 Najafgarh town, Delhi
 National Zoological Park Delhi
 Asola Bhatti Wildlife Sanctuary, Delhi
 Sultanpur National Park, bordering Delhi in adjoining Gurgaon District, Haryana
 Okhla Sanctuary, bordering Delhi in adjoining Uttar Pradesh
 Bhalswa horseshoe lake, Northwest, Delhi

References

Further reading
 Delhi Master Plan 2021: Planning Zone-L, West Zone –III of Master Plan of Delhi 2021 – Note the Najafgarh Lake Area shown therein.
 Draft Zonal Development Plan Planning Zone- 'L', Annexure-Iv-A Land Use Modifications up to 2006 in Planning Zone-“L”. 
 Flood Problem due to Sahibi River, Department of Irrigation and Flood Control, Government of NCT of Delhi, India.
 Wastewater Management in Najafgarh Drainage Basin – Key to Water Quality Improvement in River Yamuna, by Asit Nema of Foundation for Greentech Environmental Systems1 and Dr. Lalit Agrawal of Tokyo Engineering Consultants, Japan2
 Flood Control – The National Capital Territory of Delhi
 ‘Part of Najafgarh drain to be covered’, 12 September 2009, The Hindu
 How Sultanpur happened: Sultanpur and Najafgarh Jheels – by Peter Jackson, 
 ‘Reviving old ponds way out of water woes’, 9 August 2003, The Indian Express
 Action plans on polluted areas in Delhi soon, GN Bureau, New Delhi, 17 March 2010, Governance Now
 Proposal for ground water recharge in National Capital Region (NCR) by Dr. S. K. Sharma, Ground water expert, 
 , Delhi's Watery Woes by Arun Kumar Singh
 Birds are back at Najafgarh Jheel, 19 08 2010, Delhi Edition, Hindustan Times
 No more water-logging at airport with new drain in place, New Delhi, 17 December 2009, The Hindu
 Walls to be constructed around Najafgarh drain, New Delhi, 29 December 2006, Hindustan Times
 Groundwater to be recharged at Najafgarh, Mungeshwar drains, 10 March 2007, The Indian Express
 [Book: A Guide to the Birds of the Delhi Area (1975) by Usha Ganguli, a member of the Delhi Birdwatching Society. She includes sections from "The Imperial Gazetteer of India" annual colonial records of British India from Delhi detailing local wildlife and extent of water accumulation in Najafgarh Jheel basin yearly.]
 [Birdwatching Articles from 1961 -70 from Najafgarh lake by Usha Ganguli in "Newsletter for Birdwatchers" edited by Zafar Futehally]
 Migratory birds are giving Delhi the go-by, 17 Jan 2010, The Hindu
 Law-Najafgarh-Landfill Two Last New Delhi, 30 August 2006, oneindia news.
 Gurgaon polluting Najafgarh drain, draws Minister's ire-, by Rajesh Kumar, New Delhi, 27 July 2006, The Pioneer
 Winged visitors are back at Najafgarh Lake, New Delhi, 3/11/2011, Hindustan Times. Also see 
 Migratory birds vanish as wetlands shrink, New Delhi, 17 Jan 2012, (IANS), Deccan Herald Newspaper
 Chapter J.- Descriptive· pages from the Gazeteers, Delhi, 1912
 Urban Flooding and its Management, 2006. India Disaster Management Congress.IIPA Campus, IP Estate, Near ITO Road, New Delhi. National Institute of Disaster Management, Ministry of Home Affairs, Government of India
 Action Plan, Abatement of Pollution in Critically Polluted Area of Najafgarh Dran Basin Including Okhla, Naraina, Anand Parbat and Wazirpur Indl Areas, Delhi Pollution Control Committee, 4th Floor, ISBT Building, Kashmere Gate, Delhi-6, March, 2011
 Blue Delhi Declaration, White Paper on: Aiming for Sustainability and Self Sufficiency in Delhi Water Management – Evaluating Delhi’s Current Water Assets vis a vis their Utilisation
 Urban Flooding Demography and Urbanization by Shashikant Nishant Sharma snsharma.phd[@]gmail.com 11/1/2010, School of Planning and Architecture, Delhi
 Biodegradation of wastewater of Najafgarh drain, Delhi using autochthonous microbial consortia : a laboratory study. by Sharma G, Mehra NK, Kumar R. Source Limnology Unit, Department of Zoology, University of Delhi, Delhi-1 10 007, India.
 City to get its 1st bird sanctuary, 15 February 2005, Asian Age (New Delhi)
 New camp to jazz up tourism in city soon, 19 Apr 2010, Asian Age (New Delhi)
 Delhiites to cool off with aqua sports, New Delhi, 30 September 2007, Tribune News Service, The Tiribune, Chandigarh
 Proposal for groundwater recharge in National Capital Region – A report by SK Sharma and Green Systems , Submitted by Samir Nazareth on 22 April 2011, India waterportal – Safe, sustainable water for all
 Delhi Smart Cities: Project details of all over Delhi NCR. Specially all Zone of West delhi under Land Pooling Policy and Master Plan of Delhi 2021 – "Najafgarh Lake Area" shown therein.

External links
 Forest Department, Government of NCT of Delhi, India.
 Recorded Forests (Notified Forest Areas in Delhi), Forest Department, Government of National Capital Territory of Delhi, India
 Tourism Infrastructure, Tourism department, Government of National Capital Territory of Delhi, India
 Irrigation & Flood Control Department, Government of National Capital Territory of Delhi, India
 Plantation/Greening of Delhi, Department of Environment, Government of NCT of Delhi, India
 facebook Topic: Delhi – Najafgarh Drain Birdwatching Report
 facebook: Checklist of the Birds of the Najafgarh Jheel Region – Including adjoining areas of Dhansa Barrage and the Najafgarh Drain in Delhi, by Sajit P. Mohanan
 "migrantwatch" Location: Najafgarh Drain, Najafgarh, Delhi
 A Search for: Najafgarh drain on the Google group "delhibirdpix"
 U-turn: Haryana will identify Najafgarh lake as wetland, TNN, Times of India, Jan 7, 2017

Reserved forests of India
Wetlands of India
Wildlife sanctuaries in Delhi
Bird sanctuaries of Delhi
Tourist attractions in Delhi
Proposed protected areas